The Taittirīya Shakha (Sanskrit, loosely meaning 'Branch or School of the sage Tittiri'), is a shakha (i.e. 'branch', 'school', or rescension) of the Krishna (black) Yajurveda. Most prevalent in South India, it consists of the Taittirīya Samhita ('TS'), Taittirīya Brahmana ('TB'), Taittirīya Aranyaka ('TA'), and Taittirīya Pratisakhya ('TP').

Nomenclature 
The 'Taittiriya Shakha' can be loosely translated as   'Branch or School of (the sage) Tittri' or 'Branch or School of Taittiriya' or 'School of the pupils of Tittiri'.

'Taittiriya'  is derived from the name of the sage Taittiri (or Tittiri).
'Shakha' means 'branch' or 'school'.

Origin

Monier-Williams 
According to Monier-Williams Sanskrit-English Dictionary, Taittiri was a pupil of Yaska (estimated 4th-5th century BCE). According to the Vishnu Purana, Yaska was in turn a pupil of Vaiśampáyana, (estimated 6th century BCE). Taittiri is also stated in the Mahabharata to have attended 'the Yaga [Vedic ritual sacrifice] conducted by Uparicaravasu'.

Vishnu Purana 
'Tittiri' also means 'partridge'. This meaning is worked into the account of the stated origin of the School of Tittri in the Vishnu Purana (Book 3, Chapter 5). Following a division between Brahmins at Mount Meru - including Vaiśampáyana (whose pupil, Tittiri, is attributed to the Krishna (black) Yajurveda) and Yajnavalkya (attributed to the Shukla (White) Yajurveda) - 'The other scholars of Vaiśampáyana, transforming themselves to partridges (Tittiri), picked up the texts which he [Yájnawalkya] had disgorged, and which from that circumstance were called Taittiríya'. This indicates both Yaska and Taittiri were pupils of Vaiśampáyana.

The translator, H.H. Wilson, states in his commentary to this chapter that 'the term Taittiríya is more rationally accounted for in the Anukramańí or index of the black Yajush [Krishna YajurVeda]. It is there said that Vaiśampáyana taught it to Yaska, who taught it to Tittiri, who also became a teacher; whence the term Taittiríya, for a grammatical rule explains it to mean, 'The Taittiríyas are those who read what was said or repeated by Tittiri'.'

Nirukta 
Yaska, attributed as the teacher of Taittiri, is also attributed as the author of the Nirukta, a study of etymology concerned with correct interpretation of Sanskrit words in the Vedas. This is significant as the Nirukta references and quotes extensively from the Taittiriya texts (e.g. as listed in Appendix 1 of the Nirukta).

Overview 
The Taittiriya school of the Krishna (black) Yajurveda produced several types of texts constituting Sruti Vedic literature (of the YajurVeda). These are the:

 Taittiriya Samhita: Seven books of hymns and mantras. Includes Brahmana and Anukramani (index) sections. One of four total Samhitas of the Krishna YajurVeda.
 Taittiriya Brahmana: Three books of hymns, mantras, legends, astronomy, and - typical of Brahmana texts - instructions on the performance of sacrificial rites.
 Taittiriya Aranyaka: Ten books of hymns, mantras, and - typical of Aranyaka texts - Vedic theology constituting two Upanishads.
 Taittiriya Pratisakhya: One book concerned with phonetics, i.e. the correct pronunciation of words.

Notable members 
According to B.R. Modak, the scholar Sayana (died 1387 CE), notable for his commentaries on Vedic literature including the Taittirīya texts, was a member of the Taittiriya Shakha. According to G.R. Garg, Apastamba, notable for his Shrautasutras, was also a member.

Commentaries 

The 'Śrauta Sútras' (or Shrautasutras) of Apastamba (450–350 BCE), Bodhayana (500–200 BCE), and Vaikhanasa.(300–100 BCE) are theological texts concerned with procedures and ceremonies of Vedic ritual practice. All are attached to the Taittiriya Samhita.

There are other commentaries written by Sanskrit scholars and philosophers on the works of the Taittiriya Shakha. Most notably, according to B.R. Modak, Sayana wrote  commentaries on the Taittirīya texts (and others). According to N. Sharva, the Taittirīya Brāhmaṇa was also commented upon by Bhava Swāmī (circa 700 CE or earlier); Kauśika Bhaṭṭa Bhāskara Miśra (preceding and referred to by Sayana in the Nirukta and by Devarāja Yajvā in the Nighantu); and Rāmānḍara / Rāmāgnichitta.

Taittiriya Samhita 

R. Dalal states that 'The Yajur Veda consists of passages in verse and prose, arranged for the performance of yajnas (sacrifices)... The two main versions of the Yajur are known as the Shukla (or "white") Yajur Veda and the Krishna (or 'Black') Yajur Veda... of the black Yajur Veda, five shakhas are known: the Taittiriya (Apastamba), Kapishthala (Hiranyakesi), Katha, Kathaka (school of the Kaṭhas), and Maitrayani (Kalapa), with four closely related recensions, known as the Kathaka Samhita, the Kapishthala-Katha Samhita, Maitrayani Samhita, and the Taittiriya Samhita'.

Structure and Content 
The Taittiriya Samhita ('TS') consists of seven kandas (or 'books') of hymns, mantras, prayers, and three Anukramanis (indexes). In translations such as that by A.B. Keith, this Samhita is presented as the Krishna (black) Yajurveda. M. Winternitz adds that the Samhita also includes Brahmana passages (i.e. instructions and explanations of sacrificial ceremonies). The chapters (prapāṭhakas) for each of the books (kandas) of the Taittiriya Samhita are as follows: 

 Kanda 1 
 Prapāṭhaka 1: The new and full moon sacrifices
 Prapāṭhaka 2: The Soma sacrifice
 Prapāṭhaka 3: The Victim for Agni and Soma
 Prapāṭhaka 4: The Soma cups
 Prapāṭhaka 5: The Rekindling of the Fire
 Prapāṭhakas 6-7: The sacrificer's part in the new and full moon sacrifices
 Prapāṭhaka 8: The Rajasuya
 Kanda 2
Prapāṭhaka 1: The special animal sacrifices
 Prapāṭhakas 2-4: The special sacrifices
 Prapāṭhakas 5-6: The new and full moon sacrifices
 Kanda 3
 Prapāṭhakas 1-3: The supplement to the Soma sacrifice
 Prapāṭhaka 4: The optional and occasional offerings
 Prapāṭhaka 5: Miscellaneous supplements
 Kanda 4
 Prapāṭhaka 1: The lacing of the fire in the fire-pan.
 Prapāṭhaka 2: The reparation of the ground for the fire
 Prapāṭhaka 3: The five layers of bricks
 Prapāṭhaka 4: The fifth layer of bricks
 Prapāṭhaka 5: The offerings to Rudra
 Prapāṭhaka 6: The preparation of the fire
 Prapāṭhaka 7: The piling of the fire (continued)
 Kanda 5
 Prapāṭhaka 1: The placing of the fire in the fire-pan
 Prapāṭhaka 2: The preparation of the ground for the fire
 Prapāṭhaka 3: The second and later layers of bricks
 Prapāṭhakas 4-7: The piling of the fire altar (continued)
 Kanda 6
 Prapāṭhakas 1-5: The exposition of the Soma sacrifice.
 Prapāṭhaka 6: Exposition of the Daksina and other offerings
 Kanda 7
 Prapāṭhaka 1: The Ekaha and Ahina Sacrifices
 Prapāṭhaka 2: The Ahina sacrifices (continued)
 Prapāṭhakas 3-4: The Sattras.
 Prapāṭhaka 5: The Gavam Ayana

Nakshatras 

D.M. Harness states that 'The Vedic Nakshatras [stars] arose from a spiritual perception of the cosmos. Nakshatras are the mansions of the Gods or cosmic powers and of the Rishis or sages. They can also project negative or anti-divine forces, just as certain planets like Saturn have well known malefic effects. The term Nakshatra refers to a means (tra) of worship (naksha) or approach... The Nakshatras dispense the fruits of karma... For this reason Vedic rituals and meditations to the present day follow the timing of the Nakshatras... [which] are of prime [importance] in muhurta or electional astrology for determining favorable times for actions, particularly sacramental or sacred actions like marriage'.

Reference to the Nakṣhatra Sūktam (star positions relating to new and full moon ceremonies), occurs in kāṇḍa (book) 3, prapāṭhaka (chapter) 5, anuvākaḥ (section) 1 (3.5.1).

Shaivism

Shri Rudram and Namah Shivaya homages to Shiva 
The Shri Rudram Chamakam and Namah Shivaya, homages to Rudra / Shiva (the supreme deity in Shaivism), occur in kāṇḍa (book) 5, prapāṭhakas (chapters) 5 and 7 (5.5 and 5.7).

Vaishnavism

The Varaha Avatara of Vishnu 

Varaha, the boar avatar of Vishnu (listed in the Dashavatara, or ten primary incarnation of Vishnu) is primarily associated with the Puranic legend of lifting the Earth out of the cosmic ocean. A.A. Macdonell and R. Janmajit both state that the origin and development of the boar avatar is found in the Taittiriya Samhita, albeit initially as a form of Prajapati:

Another extract attributed to the early development of the Varaha avatar by Macdonell is:

Taittiriya Brahmana 

The Taittirīya Brāhmaņa ('TB')  is considered by academics to be an appendix or extension of the Taittirīya Samhita. The first two books (ashṭakas) largely consist of hymns and mantras to the Vedic-era Devas, as well as mythology, astronomy, and astrology (i.e. the Nakshatras); the third book contains commentaries and instructions on Vedic sacrificial rites such as the Purushamedha, Kaukili-Sutramani, Ashvamedha, and Agnicayana. Recorded around 300-400 BCE, it was prevalent in southern India in areas such in Andhra Pradesh, south and east of Narmada (Gujarat), and areas on the banks of the Godavari river down to the sea.

A.B Keith states that 'at a comparatively early period the formulae [i.e. mantras from the Samhitas of the YajurVeda] were accompanied by explanations, called Brahmanas, texts pertaining to the Brahman or sacred lore, in which the different acts of the ritual were given symbolical interpretations, the words of the texts commented on, and stories told to illustrate the sacrificial performance... a mass of old material, partly formulae, partly Brahmana, which had not been incorporated in the Taittiriya Samhita was collected together in the Taittiriya Brahmana, which in part contains matter more recent than the Samhita, but in part has matter as old as, at any rate, the later portions of that text'.

Structure and Content 
Based on information provided by Kashyap and R. Mitra, the chapters (prapāṭhakas) for each of the books (ashṭakas or sometimes referred to as kandas) are as follows:

 Ashṭaka 1: Pārakshudra
Prapāṭhaka 1: Explanation for the establishment of Agni
 Prapāṭhaka 2: (Devas, chants, Vishuvat, Solstices, Mahavrata, and the bird-shaped altar)
 Prapāṭhaka 3: Vajapeya Yajna
 Prapāṭhaka 4: Explanation of Soma offerings
 Prapāṭhaka 5: The powers of stars or nakshatras, rites and RigVeda Mantras
 Prapāṭhaka 6: (Unknown)
 Prapāṭhaka 7: (Unknown)
 Prapāṭhaka 8: (Unknown)
 Ashṭaka 2: Agnihotra
Prapāṭhaka 1: The Agnihotra Sacrifice
 Prapāṭhaka 2: Dasahotra Sacrifice
 Prapāṭhaka 3: Dasahotra Sacrifices concluded
 Prapāṭhaka 4: Mantras for Subsidiary Sacrifices or Upahomas
 Prapāṭhaka 5: Mantras for Subsidiary Sacrifices or Upahomas (Concluded)
 Prapāṭhaka 6: Kaukila Sautramani or the Sacrifice with Spirituous Liquor
 Prapāṭhaka 7: Ephemeral Sacrifices or Savas
 Prapāṭhaka 8: Sacrifices with especial prayers (Kamya)
 Ashṭaka 3: (Various)
 Prapāṭhaka 1: Sacrifices to the Constellations - Nakshatra Ishti
 Prapāṭhaka 2: Dars'a Ya'ga or Sacrifices meet on the wane of the Moon
 Prapāṭhaka 3: Paurnamasa Ishti or Ceremonies to be performed on the full moon
 Prapāṭhaka 4: On Human sacrifices
 Prapāṭhaka 5: Ishti Sacrifices
 Prapāṭhaka 6: Pa'Shuka Hotra
 Prapāṭhaka 7: Expiations for defects in the performance of ceremonies
 Prapāṭhaka 8: On the operations of the first day of the Asvamedha sacrifice
 Prapāṭhaka 9: On the operations of the second and third days of the horse sacrifice
 Prapāṭhaka 10: Sa'vitra-Chayana or collection of fire for the adoration of the sun
 Prapāṭhaka 11: Nachiketa-Chayana, or collection of Nachiketa Fire
 Prapāṭhaka 12: Cha-tur-hotra and Vaisvasrij ceremonies

Taittiriya Aranyaka 

The Taittiriya Aranyaka ('TA') is primarily a theological text consisting of ten chapters (prapāṭhakas). J. Dowson states that 'Aranyaka' means 'belonging to the forest' as this type of text is intended to 'expound the mystical sense of the [sacrificial] ceremonies, discuss the nature of God [etc.]. They are attached to the Brahmanas, and [are] intended for study in the forest by brahmanas who have retired from the distractions of the world'. As illustrated below, the Taittiriya Aranyaka contains a Brahmana text of its own, the Pravargya Brahmana, as well as two Upanishads, the Taittiriya Upanishad (a Muktika or primary Upanishad) and the Mahanarayana Upanishad (a minor Vaishnava Upanishad).

Structure and Content 
R. Mitra states that the Taittiriya Aranyaka is 'by far the largest of the Aranyakas. It extends altogether to ten prapāṭhakas or 'Great Lessons', i.e. books or chapters, of which the last four are Upanishads, and the first six, are Aranyaka strictly so-called'. The 10 chapters (prapāṭhakas) of the Taittiriya Aranyaka, including numbers of anuvakas (sections) for each, are as follows:

Vaishnavism 
The Mahanarayana Upanishad is classified as a Vaishnava Upanishad. In addition to this, the Taittiriya Aranyaka is also considered significant by academics in the development of the avatars (or incarnations) and their associated legends of the RigVedic god Vishnu, the supreme being in Vaishnavism.

The Varaha Avatara of Vishnu 
A. Daniélou states that a hundred-armed black boar lifts the earth out of the waters in the Taittiriya Aranyaka (TA 10.1.8). J. Eggeling in note 451:1 to the Shatapatha Brahmana (relating to the Shukla or White Yajurveda) incorrectly states it was 'a black boar with a thousand arms'. The Journal Of The Indian Society Of Oriental Art (volume 13) states 'in the ‘Taittiriya Aranyaka’, the earth is said to have been raised by a black boar with a hundred arms (‘varahena krsnena satabahuna uddhrta’). It is an easily understandable step to the making of the boar an incarnation of Visnu himself, a step which is finally taken in the epics and the Puranas'.  This legend is also contained in the Mahanarayana Upanishad (prapāṭhaka 10 of the Taittiriya Aranyaka):

As 'Krishna' also means 'black', the verse can also be interpreted as 'black boar' or 'raised up by the black boar', as stated by Daniélou and Eggeling. However, the translation given above clearly shows how Krishna is linked with Varaha.

The Kurma Avatara of Vishnu 
N. Aiyangar states that the following verse from the Taittiriya Aranyaka (prapāṭhaka 1.23-25) 'is narrated in connection with the ritual called Arunaketuka-kayana, in which the tortoise ['Kurma'] is placed below the uttara-vedi [altar]. In it Prajapati or his juice the Tortoise is called Arunaketu (one who had red rays)':

The Vātaraśanāḥ Rishis (or Munis) created are also mentioned in RigVeda 10.136, where Shiva drank water/poison, linking to the legend of Kurma and the churning of the Ocean of Milk, referred to as the Samudra manthan. Prajapati then encounters a tortoise (Kurma/Arunaketu) that existed even before he, the creator of the universe, came into being.

Taittiriya Pratisakhya 

The Taittiriya Pratisakhya ('TP') is concerned with phonetics, i.e. the correct pronunciation of words.

Structure and Content 
The 24 chapters of the Taittiriya Pratisakhya are as follows:

 List of sounds
 Origin of sounds
 Shortening of vowels
 Pragraha or uncombinable words
 Sanhita or combination of words
 Conversions of s and visarjaniya into sh.
 Conversion of n into ṇ
 Changes of unaspirated surds
 Changes of h, ah, áh, n, ṉ, án, in, etc.
Coalescence of vowels
 Elision of vowels
 Elision of vowels
 Elision of m
 Duplication
 Nasalization
 the use of n
 Various opinions about nasality
 Opinions about the aspiration of Om
 Emphasis and shaking
 Different kinds of circumflex letters
 Division of consonants in syllabication
 Formation of articulate sounds, tones, pitch, long and short syllables, etc.
Articulation
 Various kinds of texts, and qualifications of Vedic teachers and readers

Manuscripts and translations

Supplemental 

Ápastamba's Śrauta Sútra (Sanskrit) edited by D. Garbe (1882): Prasnas 1-7 and Prasnas 8-15

References 

Vedas